The Imam Dur Mausoleum or Qubba Imam Al-Dur was a mausoleum in Iraq which dates back to the Uqaylid era. The mausoleum was located twenty kilometers north of Samarra in Saladin Governorate.

History 
The mausoleum dates back to the 11th century, and was first administered by the Seljuk court, which was mainly a Sunni Islamic institution. The architect of the mausoleum was Abu Shakir ibn Abi al-Faraj. The building was among the many works that the chamberlain, Abu Jafar Muhammad, ordered to be completed. The construction of the mausoleum was eventually completed before 1094. The mausoleum was the earliest datable example of a building that used a muqarnas dome. The legal caretaker, or mutawalli, of the mausoleum was Qadi Mu'nis ibn Hamdan, who was succeeded in this role by Hasan ibn Rafi.

At some point of time, a mosque was built next to the mausoleum, but only the mausoleum was present in photographs by travelers in the 20th century.

Architecture 
The site of the Imam Dur Mausoleum is a walled enclosure.

The mausoleum building is a cube-shaped structure topped with a muqarnas dome. The base of the muqarnas dome was a tall cube bolstered by pillars, one in each corner, that were made of baked brick. Banna'i brickwork adorned each pillar and a band at the top of the base. Surmounting the cube was the muqarnas dome resting on a tall, octagonal drum. The shell of the dome consisted of three increasingly narrower octagonal drums, each rotated slightly to form a spiral effect. At the top of each drum was a dome-shaped cupola.

The tomb chamber is entered through a door on the North side of the building. Inside, it features stucco ornamentation, which includes rows of blind lobed arches. The inner part of the muqarnas dome's highest cupola is decorated with fluting.

Imam Dur's identity 
The identity of the entombed person is disputed. An inscription on the exterior of the mausoleum states that the building is a turba, or tomb, of Abu 'Abd-Allah Muhammad Al-Durri, a senior scholar of Ad-Dawr and the son of the seventh Shia Imam, Musa Al-Kadhim. He was buried in 838. Another inscription states that the entombed is the Uqaylid amir, Sharaf al-Dawla Muslim ibn Quraysh who died in 1085.

2014 demolition 
The Imam Dur Mausoleum was detonated by the Islamic State of Iraq and the Levant on 23 October 2014.

As of 2016, a reconstruction is taking place.

References 

Buildings and structures demolished in 2014
Mausoleums in Iraq
Mosques in Iraq
11th-century mosques